Northrop Grumman Sperry Marine is a part of Northrop Grumman Mission Systems. Through various mergers, Northrop Grumman Sperry Marine was built out of companies including  Decca Radars, Sperry Marine, and C. Plath and Litton Industries. The company is headquartered in New Malden, UK, with offices in Germany, Netherlands, Denmark, China, India, Singapore, South Korea, USA, and Canada. It is one of the few remaining namesakes of the Sperry Corporation still in business.

Sperry Marine is one of the oldest manufacturers of gyrocompasses. Its founder, Elmer Ambrose Sperry, was working on the first prototype of the gyrocompass at the same time as Hermann Anschütz-Kaempfe was developing his. Eventually, the rivalry between these two inventors over the gyrocompass went to court, where Albert Einstein was included as an unambiguous expert.

Northrop Grumman Sperry Marine currently operates in over 15 countries and employs over 500 people.

References

External links
Sperry Marine website
 
Radar
Northrop Grumman